Dyce Academy is the only state secondary school in Dyce, a small suburb of Aberdeen, serving as the sole provider of secondary education in the area. Dyce Academy's catchment area includes Dyce and the nearby village of Newmachar, though some pupils do attend from other nearby areas such as Bucksburn.

The school's construction began in the late 1970s and was completed in 1980. The building has typical architecture of state schools of this period, with concrete in abundance. The main section of the building has three floors hosting various departments whilst the Physical Education, Drama, Technical and Music departments are in various "wings" which come off of the building.

Uniform
Dyce Academy has for most its existence, been a uniform-free school. However, following the retirement of Michael Taylor, the original head teacher of the school, in 2008, a dress code of black and white was introduced the following year. There is a now a red and blue striped tie which is optional to wear for students in S1–S3, but is compulsory for senior pupils.

Aberdeen City Music School
Since 2001 Dyce Academy has been host to the Aberdeen City Music School (also known as ACMS) which is a music school in Scotland. Under this programme, students travel to Dyce to be taught advanced music whilst still engaging with the national curriculum. The ACMS provides lodging beside the school for pupils who come from more than three miles away.

MICAS base
Dyce Academy is host to one of Aberdeen's MICAS bases, a support system that helps school age pupils diagnosed with Autistic Spectrum Disorder (ASD) the chance to be educated at a mainstream school. The numbers are limited to eight pupils to allow for the base to be a peaceful place away from the crowded mainstream classroom.

Natalie King case
In 2004, a former pupil of the school, Natalie King, launched a lawsuit against Aberdeen council, seeking £20,000 compensation on the basis of her claims that she was bullied at schools in the area, including Dyce Academy, and that the teachers failed to protect her. In 2006 it was reported that King had dropped her legal action.

Notable former pupils

Roy McBain - footballer
Mark McDonald Member of the Scottish Parliament

References

External links 
Dyce Academy Website
Dyce Academy's page on Parentzone
Aberdeen City Music School
Aberdeen City Music School official site

Secondary schools in Aberdeen
1980 establishments in Scotland
Educational institutions established in 1980